There is a rapidly growing Mexican-American population in the Dallas-Fort Worth area.

 people of Mexican origins made up 80% of the Hispanics and Latinos in the DFW area.

History
Sol Villasana, the author of Dallas's Little Mexico, wrote that "Mexicans have been part of Dallas since its beginning." In the 1870s the first significant groups of Mexicans came to Dallas as railroad lines were constructed. Additional Mexicans settled Dallas as a result of the Mexican Revolution, which began in 1910.

According to the 1920 U.S. Census, 3,378 Mexicans lived in Dallas. In the early 20th century, wealthier Mexicans lived in Little Mexico and in the historical red-light area of Dallas north of Downtown, while less wealthy immigrants lived along railroad yards. Caroline B. Brettell, author of '"Big D" Incorporating New Immigrants in a Sunbelt Suburban Metropolis,' wrote that as of 1920 the majority of Dallas's Mexicans "were living in atrocious conditions."

After World War II Little Mexico began to disintegrate.

The Murder of Santos Rodriguez occurred in 1973.

In 2009 the City of Dallas began pursuing an EB-5 investment program, attracting wealthier Mexicans. By 2012 there was a wave of wealthy Mexican immigration, due to the program, the proximity and access of Mexico to North Texas, and the violence of the Mexican drug war.

Demographics
As of the 2000 U.S. Census, 71% of the foreign-born residents of Dallas originated in Mexico, as were 64% of the foreign-born residents of McKinney, and 22% of the foreign-born residents of Plano. 25% Of Foreign Born residents of Carrollton

Education
Rapid growth of the Hispanic community in the last decade has now made them majority in a fair share of school districts in the DFW area.  These school districts include:  Dallas ISD, Fort Worth ISD, Arlington ISD, Irving ISD, Richardson ISD, Mesquite ISD, Garland ISD, Grand Prairie ISD, and Carrollton-Farmers Branch ISD.

Geography
As of the 2000 U.S. Census, 63% of the ethnic Mexicans in Dallas County resided in the Dallas city limits. Many Mexicans in Dallas live in lower income housing, especially in South Dallas.  the Mexican population lived in various parts of the DFW area, with concentrations in West Dallas, Oak Cliff, and Arlington.

As of 2000 there was a large group of ethnic Mexicans living north of Arlington in an area south of Interstate 30, and a smaller group in the cities between Dallas and Fort Worth south of U.S. Highway 183.

Economy
As of 2012 there are about 20 daily flights between Dallas/Fort Worth International Airport and Mexico.

El Fenix, a Tex-Mex restaurant chain, was established by Mike Martinez, a Mexican American. It was established on September 15, 1918. Christina Rosales of The Dallas Morning News wrote that it "has been credited with starting the Tex-Mex craze in the U.S."

Pizza Patrón, headquartered in Dallas, markets itself to Mexican American families. It was established by Antonio Swad, a person not of Mexican origins.

Notable residents
 Selena Gomez (actress & singer) - Raised in Grand Prairie, lived in Fort Worth
 Demi Lovato (singer & actress) - Born in Albuquerque, New Mexico; raised in Dallas
 Omar Gonzalez (soccer player)
 Roberto Marroquin (boxer)
 Fernando Rodríguez (boxer)
 Santos Rodriguez (murder victim)

See also

 Latino Cultural Center
 Demographics of Dallas-Fort Worth

References
 Brettell, Caroline B. '"Big D" Incorporating New Immigrants in a Sunbelt Suburban Metropolis' (Chapter 3). In: Singer, Audrey, Susan Wiley Hardwick, and Caroline Brettell. Twenty-First Century Gateways: Immigrant Incorporation in Suburban America (James A. Johnson metro series). Brookings Institution Press, 2009. . Start p. 53.
 Villasana, Sol. Dallas's Little Mexico (Images of America). Arcadia Publishing, 2011. .

Notes

Further reading
 Adler, Rachel H. Yucatecans in Dallas, Texas: Breaching the Border, Bridging the Distance. Routledge (Second edition: July 10, 2007 - )
 Cordell, Dennis D. (Southern Methodist University) and Manuel Garcia y Griego (University of Texas at Arlington). "THE INTEGRATION OF NIGERIAN AND MEXICAN IMMIGRANTS IN DALLAS/FORT WORTH, TEXAS" (Archive) - International Union for the Scientific Study of Population (IUSSP) XXV International Population Conference, 2005. Working paper.
 Watson, Walter T. "Mexicans in Dallas." Southwest Review 22 (1937): p. 406.
 Cloer, Katherine. Advisor: Roberto R. Calderon. "A champion for the Chicano community: Anita N. Martínez and her contributions to the city of Dallas, 1969–1973 (master's degree thesis)." ProQuest Dissertations and Theses, 2011. Information page

 Cuellar, Carlos Eliseo. "Stories from the barrios: A history of Mexican Fort Worth" (PhD dissertation, Texas Christian University; ProQuest Dissertations Publishing,  1998. 9832809).

 "Mexican Migration: Families Fuel Population Boom." The Dallas Morning News.

External links
 Dallas Mexican American Historical League (DMAHL)
 Dallas Hispanic Bar Association (DHBA)

Mexicans
History of Dallas
History of Fort Worth, Texas
Mexican-American history
Dallas